Georg Holke (29 January 1891 – 30 April 1977) was a German architect. His work was part of the architecture event in the art competition at the 1928 Summer Olympics.

References

1891 births
1977 deaths
20th-century German architects
Olympic competitors in art competitions
People from Potsdam